Zachary "Zach" James (born December 7, 1981) is an American actor, singer, recording artist and 2022 Grammy Award winner. He is best known for creating the role of Lurch in The Addams Family on Broadway, Abraham Lincoln in the world premiere Philip Glass opera, The Perfect American, Amenhotep III in the Olivier and Grammy Award-winning production of Akhnaten and for appearances on the television shows, 30 Rock, Murphy Brown, Law & Order: Organized Crime and The Blacklist. Zachary was named the Most Innovative Opera Singer of 2019 by The Classical Post, Breakout Opera Artist of 2019 by Verismo Magazine and was identified as an industry leader and invited to be an official ambassador for Opera America. He has sung with some of the world's top opera companies and orchestras including English National Opera, LA Opera, Teatro Real, The New York Philharmonic, Philadelphia Orchestra, Opera Philadelphia and NHK Symphony Orchestra Tokyo and made his Metropolitan Opera debut in 2019 in Akhnaten. His debut visual album, Call Out, has played 31 film festivals worldwide and received the highly commended designation from London’s Classical Music Digital Awards. His solo show, On Broadway, won him BroadwayWorld’s Vocalist of the Decade and Performer of the Decade awards for the years 2010-2020. The show was filmed live at Chris’s Jazz Cafe in Philadelphia, produced by Des Moines Metro Opera, and released as an album in 2021. Zachary is the host and creator of the comedy talkshow, What Happened Was... airing every Friday on TDO Network, produced by Dallas Opera.

Biography

Early life
James was born in Providence, Rhode Island and grew up in Spring Hill, Florida. The son of a professional jazz guitarist, James played percussion and served as drum major in his high school marching band. Although his first goal was to become a band director, he had a longing for musical theater. James, inspired by actor Nathan Lane, majored in musical theatre at Ithaca College and later moved to New York City.

Career
Zachary James created the role of Lurch in the Broadway musical production of The Addams Family. James appeared in the Original Broadway Cast of Coram Boy and also in the original cast of the Tony Award-winning Broadway revival of South Pacific. New York credits include the role of Oberon in the world premiere of Kristin Hevner's Il Sogno. As an operatic singer, he created the role of Abraham Lincoln in Philip Glass' opera The Perfect American at the Teatro Real in Madrid which was broadcast on Medici TV and created the role of Terry in the world premiere of Breaking the Waves by Missy Mazzoli for Opera Philadelphia. He created the speaking role of The Scribe/Amenhotep III in Phelim McDermott's Laurence Olivier Award winning 2016 production of Philip Glass’s Akhnaten at English National Opera. He reprised the role in the production’s revivals at the Los Angeles Opera, English National Opera in 2019 and the Metropolitan Opera in November and December 2019. James played the role of John Claggart in Billy Budd at Des Moines Metro Opera in 2017. The production was broadcast on Iowa Public Television and won an Emmy Award. He also performed with English National Opera, Los Angeles Opera, The Philadelphia Orchestra, NHK Symphony Orchestra Tokyo, The New York Philharmonic, Des Moines Metro Opera, Cincinnati Opera, Dallas Opera, Opera Omaha, Opera Saratoga, Arizona Opera, Virginia Opera, Nashville Opera, Fort Worth Opera, Ash Lawn Opera, Knoxville Opera, Central City Opera, Anchorage Opera, Opera Roanoke, Union Avenue Opera, Opera Ithaca, Shreveport Opera, American Lyric Theater, New York City Ballet and Australia's Opera Queensland.

Regional theatre credits include Miles Gloriosus in A Funny Thing Happened on the Way to the Forum and Sweeney Todd in Sweeney Todd: The Demon Barber of Fleet Street. James also appeared in his own one man opera, Imbecile d' Amour, that played in New York in 2008, in Chicago in late 2009, and again in New York in 2010 and 2011. In 2010 through the end of 2011 he starred as Lurch in the original cast of the Broadway musical The Addams Family. In 2008, James made a cameo appearance as the character "Carl" in the 30 Rock episode "Gavin Volure". In 2018 he appeared on CBS as the Secret Serviceman to Mike Pence on the series finale of Murphy Brown and in 2022 on NBC's Law & Order: Organized Crime as Jacob. His solo show, Zachary James on Broadway, about his time working on Broadway and living in New York has been seen in Alaska, Hawaii, Iowa, Florida, New York and Pennsylvania. James won the 2022 Grammy Award for Best Opera Recording for his work on Philip Glass' Akhnaten.

Personal life 
James is an out gay artist and has been featured in LGBTQ publications and interviews and was named one of the 30 most influential LGBTQIA+ artists in Opera by OperaWire. James is a life-long advocate for animal rights and volunteers with the anti-fur trade fox sanctuary, Pawsitive Beginnings, in Key Largo, Florida, He narrated their mini documentary, Chasing Fur, in 2020. He is a sexual assault survivor and came forward with his story in 2019 as part of the MeToo Movement. He lives and travels with his rescued miniature pinscher, Sir Arthur "Artie" Seymour Sullivan, named after the British composer of The Pirates of Penzance. James has been sober since November, 2011, and credits sobriety as a key factor of his success.

Awards
2021 Cult Critic Movie Awards
2022 Grammy Award Best Opera Recording

References

External links
 Zach James Website

1981 births
Male actors from Florida
Living people
American operatic basses
Singers from Florida
Actors from Providence, Rhode Island
Musicians from Providence, Rhode Island
Male actors from Rhode Island
Ithaca College alumni
American operatic bass-baritones
21st-century American male actors
21st-century American singers
People from Spring Hill, Florida
21st-century American male singers